

Seeds

Qualifiers
First qualifier:  Bojana Jovanovski
Second qualifier:  Irina-Camelia Begu
Third qualifier:  Tsvetana Pironkova
Fourth qualifier:  Gréta Arn

Qualifying draw

First qualifier

Second qualifier

Third qualifier

Fourth qualifier

References
Qualifying Draw

Polsat Warsaw Open
Polsat Warsaw Open